Guane is a municipality and town in the Pinar del Río Province of Cuba. It was founded in 1602.

Geography
The municipality is divided into the barrios of Cabo de San Antonio y La Fe, Catalina, Cortés, Hato de Guane, Isabel Rubio (Paso Real de Guane), Juan Gómez, La Grifa, Las Martinas, Los Acostas, Manuel Lazo (Cayuco), Portales, Pueblo, Punta de la Sierra, Sábalo and Tenería.

The wards of the municipality include Punta de La Sierra, Portales, Guane 1, Guane 2, Combate la Teneria, Isabel Rubio, Sabalo, and Mollna.

History
Guane is a Cuban Indigenous name. Before it was renamed Pinar del Río in 1774, the area was known as the old colonial capital of Guane.

It was the main city of Filipino migrants to Cuba, who were known as Chinos Manila among the local population. The Filipinos worked the huge tobacco plantations much as they did in their home country, in the present provinces of Ilocos Sur, Tarlac, Ilocos Norte, Cagayan and Isabela.  During that time, the Spanish colonizers had a virtual monopoly of the tobacco trade through their company, the Tabacalera.

Demographics
In 2004, the municipality of Guane had a population of 35,893.

See also
Guane Municipal Museum
tuKola 
Municipalities of Cuba
List of cities in Cuba

References

External links

Populated places in Pinar del Río Province
1602 establishments in the Spanish Empire
Populated places established in 1602